Rud syndrome is a poorly characterized disorder, probably of X-linked recessive inheritance, named after Einar Rud who described 2 patients with the case in 1927 and 1929. It was argued that all reported cases of Rud syndrome are genetically heterogeneous and significantly differ from the original case reports of Rud and that the designation Rud syndrome should be eliminated and that the patients with such diagnosis should be reassigned to other syndromes, such as Refsum disease and Sjögren-Larsson syndrome. Some consider Rud syndrome and Sjögren-Larsson syndrome the same entity and that Rud syndrome does not exist.

Presentation
While inclusion criteria for Rud syndrome have varied considerably, the major manifestations include congenital ichthyosis, hypogonadism, small stature, mental retardation, and epilepsy. Ocular findings were inconsistently reported and included strabismus, blepharoptosis, blepharospasm, glaucoma, cataract, nystagmus, and retinitis pigmentosa. Other systemic includes metabolic, bony, neurologic, and muscular abnormalities.

Diagnosis

Treatment

Eponym
In 1929, the Danish physician Einar Rud described a 22-year-old Danish male had ichthyosis, hypogonadism, short stature, epilepsy, anemia, and polyneuritis. In 1929, he described a 29-year-old female with ichthyosis, hypogonadism, partial gigantism, and diabetes mellitus.

References

External links 

Genetic disorders with OMIM but no gene
Syndromes affecting the skin
Syndromes with intellectual disability
Syndromes with short stature
Syndromes affecting the eye
Syndromes affecting the endocrine system
Syndromes with seizures
Rare diseases